Licia Troisi (born 25 November 1980 in Rome) is an Italian fantasy writer.

Her first published book was Nihal della terra del vento (Nihal of the Wind land), published in 2004. This is the first book of a fantasy trilogy entitled Cronache del mondo emerso (Chronicles of the Emerged World). Later, she embarked on a second trilogy, Le guerre del mondo emerso (Wars of the Emerged World) and Le leggende del Mondo Emerso (Legends of the Emerged World). She sold about 900,000 copies in Italy, which currently makes her the best-selling Italian fantasy writer.  Her works have been translated into other languages, including German, Lithuanian, French, Dutch, Russian, Polish, Spanish, Portuguese and Romanian.
  
Resident in Rome, Licia Troisi also works in astrophysics at the Italian Space Agency. She graduated in physics with a specialization in astrophysics at the University of Rome Tor Vergata. Troisi was married in April 2007 and in December 2009 her daughter Irene was born.

Works 
Cronache Del Mondo Emerso Chronicles Of The Emerged World: 3 Books
 Nihal Della Terra Del Vento Nihal From The Land Of Wind. Mondadori, April 2004.
 La Missione Di Sennar Sennar's Mission. Mondadori, October 2004.
 Il Talismano Del Potere The Talisman Of Power. Mondadori, April 2005.
 Le Guerre Del Mondo Emerso Wars Of The Emerged World: 3 Books
 La Setta Degli Assassini The Guild Of Assassins. Mondadori, April 2006.
 Le Due Guerriere The Two Warriors. Mondadori, 27 February 2007.
 Un Nuovo Regno A New Kingdom. Mondadori, 13 November 2007.
 I Dannati Di Malva Edizioni Ambiente
 La Ragazza Drago The Dragon Girl: 5 Books
 L'Eredità Di Thuban Thuban's Heritage. Mondadori, 15 April 2008
 L'Albero Di Idhunn The Tree Of Idhunn. Mondadori, 2009
 La Clessidra Di Aldibah The Hourglass Of Aldibah. Mondadori, 2010
 I Gemelli Di Kuma The Twins Of Kuma. Mondadori, 2011
 L'Ultima Battaglia The Ultimate Battle Mondadori, 2012
 Le Creature del Mondo Emerso The Creatures of the Emerged World: Spin-off
 Le Leggende del Mondo Emerso The Legends Of The Emerged World: 3 Books
 Il Destino Di Adhara Adhara's Destiny.
 Figlia Del Sangue Daughter Of The Blood. Mondadori, 17 November 2009
 Gli Ultimi Eroi The Last Heroes.

References

External links
 Author's homepage.
 Interview (Italian)

1980 births
Living people
Italian fantasy writers
Italian women novelists
Writers from Rome
University of Rome Tor Vergata alumni
Women science fiction and fantasy writers